The following highways are numbered 459:

Canada
Manitoba Provincial Road 459

Japan
 Japan National Route 459

United States
  Interstate 459
  Kentucky Route 459
  Maryland Route 459
  Montana Secondary Highway 459
  Puerto Rico Highway 459
  Farm to Market Road 459